Inert may refer to:

 Chemically inert, not chemically reactive
 Inert gas
 Noble gas, historically called inert gas
 Inert knowledge, information which one can express but not use
 Inert waste, waste which is neither chemically nor biologically reactive and will not decompose
 Inert ingredient, a component of the excipient of a pharmaceutical drug
 Inert matter, a matter that is not alive. See Life#Range of tolerance
Inert prime, a type of behaviour of a prime under an algebraic extension
Inert munition, a dummy round that does not contain any energetic material

See also

 Inertia (disambiguation)